Shafter Township is one of twenty townships in Fayette County, Illinois, USA.  As of the 2010 census, its population was 485 and it contained 201 housing units.  Shafter Township was formed out of Sharon Township in December, 1920.

Geography

Extinct towns
 Shafter

Cemeteries
The township contains these seven cemeteries: Brackenbush, Browning, Cook, Hoffman, Holy Cross Lutheran, Lawler and Rush.

Major highways
  Illinois Route 185

Lakes
 Vandalia Lake

Demographics

School districts
 Ramsey Community Unit School District 204
 Vandalia Community Unit School District 203

Political districts
 Illinois' 19th congressional district
 State House District 102
 State Senate District 51

References
 
 United States Census Bureau 2007 TIGER/Line Shapefiles
 United States National Atlas

External links
 City-Data.com
 Illinois State Archives

Townships in Fayette County, Illinois
Populated places established in 1920
Townships in Illinois